Michael Barne (15 October 1877 – 31 May 1961) was an officer of the 1901-04 Discovery Expedition and was the last survivor of the expedition.

Early life
Barne was born at Sotterley Park, Suffolk, the son of Frederick Barne and his wife, Lady Constance Adelaide Seymour, daughter of Francis Seymour, 5th Marquess of Hertford. His father was Member of Parliament for East Suffolk. He entered the Navy as a Midshipman in 1893. In 1898 he was commissioned to serve aboard HMS Porcupine.

Selected for "Discovery"
In 1901 he was appointed by Scott as Second Lieutenant to the Polar Expedition. Despite suffering frostbite Barne made copious notes throughout his three years with the expedition, both about general conditions and his specialist fields( magnetronemy and Soundings). Scott rated his ability to calm possible tensions highly. Barne Inlet, a  feature on the western side of the Ross Ice Shelf that he discovered, is named after him. He was awarded the Polar Medal for his contribution to the expedition.

Post-Antarctic career
Marrying on his return from the Antarctic, Barne returned to active service with command of the Coquette, but still corresponded with Scott about modes of transport for future expeditions. During the First World War, he was awarded the DSO while commanding Monitor M27, finally retiring in 1919 with the rank of Captain. During the next war Barne came out of retirement to command an anti-submarine patrol ship.

References

Bibliography
Barne, M. Need for Continuity in the Conduct of Antarctic Discovery The Geographical Journal, Vol. 27, No. 2 (Feb., 1906), p. 206 
Barne, M The National Antarctic Expedition The Geographical Journal, Vol. 18, No. 3 (Sep., 1901), pp. 275–279 
Barne, M MS 366 1902-03: Papers relating to Discovery Expedition GB/NNAF/P160000 (Former ISAAR ref: GB/NNAF/P1579) 1982 Cambridge University: Scott Polar Research Institute
Fiennes, R Scott (Coronet, London,2003) 
Headland R.K.Journal of Polar Studies (1985) volume 2 part 1 p357-359 SPRI Antarctic Chronology, unpublished corrected revision of Chronological list of Antarctic expeditions and related historical events, (1 December 2001) Cambridge University Press (1989) 
Holland, C. Manuscripts in the Scott Polar Research Institute, Cambridge, England - a catalogue. (Garland Publishing New York and London 1982) .
Stonehouse, B (Ed) Encyclopaedia of Antarctica and the Southern Oceans, John Wiley & Sons, Chichester (2002) 

1877 births
People from Beccles
Recipients of the Polar Medal
1961 deaths
Michael
Explorers of Antarctica